Dashnyamyn Tömör-Ochir (born 13 August 1964) is a Mongolian former cyclist. He competed at the 1992 Summer Olympics and the 1996 Summer Olympics.

References

External links
 

1964 births
Living people
Mongolian male cyclists
Olympic cyclists of Mongolia
Cyclists at the 1992 Summer Olympics
Cyclists at the 1996 Summer Olympics
Cyclists at the 1990 Asian Games
Cyclists at the 1994 Asian Games
Cyclists at the 1998 Asian Games
Asian Games medalists in cycling
Asian Games silver medalists for Mongolia
Asian Games bronze medalists for Mongolia
Place of birth missing (living people)
Medalists at the 1990 Asian Games
20th-century Mongolian people